The 1995 FIBA European Championship, commonly called FIBA EuroBasket 1995, was the 29th FIBA EuroBasket regional basketball championship held by FIBA Europe, which also served as Europe qualifier for the 1996 Summer Olympics, giving a berth to each of the top four teams in the final standings. It was held in Greece between 21 June and 2 July 1995. Fourteen national teams entered the event under the auspices of FIBA Europe, the sport's regional governing body. The city of Athens hosted the tournament. FR Yugoslavia won its first FIBA European title, by defeating Lithuania by the score of 96–90 in the final. Lithuania's Šarūnas Marčiulionis was voted the tournament's MVP. This edition of the FIBA EuroBasket tournament saw the successful return of the Lithuania national team to the competition, since its last triumph in 1939.

The tournament's official anthem was "Wings of Tomorrow" by Finnish band Stratovarius.

Venues
All games were played at the O.A.C.A. Olympic Indoor Hall in Athens.

Qualification

Format
The teams were split in two groups of seven teams each. The top four teams from each group advance to the knockout quarterfinals.
The winners in the semifinals compete for the European Championship, while the losers from the semifinals play a consolation game for the third place.
The losers in the quarterfinals compete in a separate bracket to define 5th through 8th place in the final standings.

Squads

Preliminary round
Times given below are in Eastern European Summer Time (UTC+3).

Group A

|}

Group B

|}

Knockout stage

Championship bracket

Quarterfinals

Semifinals

Third place

Final
One of the most intense matches in Eurobasket history, the finals match-up between Yugoslavia and Lithuania on Sunday, 2 July 1995 almost ended in scandal. Played in the boiling atmosphere of the Athens' OAKA, more than 20,000 people filled up the arena, most of them local Greeks vociferously cheering for Lithuania, or more specifically cheering against Yugoslavia because it eliminated Greece in the semifinals.

From the start, the two teams matched up evenly, as Lithuania's Šarūnas Marčiulionis and Arvydas Sabonis and Yugoslavia's Aleksandar Đorđević and Predrag Danilović exchanged points. At halftime, the Lithuanians were ahead by a point, 49–48. Vlade Divac got a technical foul early in first half. In second half, an American referee George Toliver signaled Lithuanian center Arvydas Sabonis for a technical foul, which led to Lithuanian protestations.

After a few more fouls signaled by the referee, one offensive and one technical against Lithuania, the Lithuanian team refused to return to the court after timeout. After a few minutes, Aleksandar Đorđević, who was the leading scorer with 41 points (made 9 three-pointers out of 12 attempted), tried to convince Marčiulionis to continue playing.

The persuasions were successful, and five Lithuanians returned to the court. Yugoslavia was leading 93–89 with 2 minutes remaining in the game. Players Arvydas Sabonis and Rimas Kurtinaitis could not return to the court, as they fouled out before the Lithuanian refusal to play. And although the Lithuanian team tried their hardest to catch up with the Yugoslavian team, they eventually lost 96–90.

After the Yugoslavs' victory, the Greek crowd that cheered against Yugoslavia throughout the final further showed their displeasure during the winners ceremony by chanting "Lithuania is the champion!". Furthermore, there was controversy during the medal ceremony as right before the winning Yugoslav team were about to receive their gold medals, the third-placed Croatian team, in an unprecedented move, stepped down from the medal podium and walked off the court due to the ongoing war between the two countries.

5th to 8th place

Statistical leaders

Individual Tournament Highs

Points

Rebounds

Assists

Steals

Minutes

Individual Game Highs

Team Tournament Highs

Offensive PPG

Rebounds

Assists

Steals

Team Game highs

Awards

Final standings

References

External links
 1995 European Championship for Men archive.FIBA.com

1995
1994–95 in Greek basketball
1994–95 in European basketball
Sports competitions in Athens
1995
June 1995 sports events in Europe
July 1995 sports events in Europe
1990s in Athens